Lenny Robinson may refer to:
Lenny B. Robinson (1963–2015), Real-Life Batman impersonator
Charlene Robinson, a fictional character from the Australian soap opera Neighbours